The Palacio Municipal de Lima or City Hall of Lima is a public building that serves as headquarters of the Metropolitan Municipality of Lima. It is located on the street Portal de Escribanos, block 3 of Jirón de la Unión, and in front of the Plaza Mayor of Lima's historic centre.

History

Viceroyalty 

According to the first book of the Cabildo de Lima, the city had two mayors on the fourth day of its foundation: Nicolás de Ribera and Juan Tello de Guzmán. At first the council worked at the House of Pizarro and then moved to the residence of the Judges Andrés de Cianca and Pedro Maldonado, then the local municipality, before settling in the last weeks of October 1535 on land owned by the supplier García de Salcedo, where the Archbishop's Palace of Lima currently stands. However, because more space was needed for the Cathedral of Lima, the council moved in 1548 to land owned by Hernando Pizarro, the huaca of the chapter that had a pen of llamas, and this is where the current municipal building is located.

The colonial town hall building was simple and the story of its construction has been bumpy. The master Diego de Torres was asked to build the first building of the Cabildo de Lima and in 1549 began the work quickly, with two black slaves acquired especially to strengthen his work, because I had finished before the arrival of Antonio de Mendoza, fourth viceroy of Peru, which was scheduled for September 23, 1551. The council houses built by master Diego de Torres were made with brick mold and high wood to Spain.

Soon after, in 1555, Cristóbal Garzón and Diego de Amaro took charge of the new building. During the following years some minor fixes continued such as woodwork and blanket. José de la Riva Agüero then stated that the building had collapsed due to its faulty construction. The council members were present, from the old town hall colonial balconies, processions, bullfights and auto-da-fé.

The history of the Limean Inquisition recalls the auto-da-fé held on Sunday, April 5, 1592, for which the council built a wooden platform. By 1628, the historian and priest Bernabé Cobo described in his History of the Founding of Lima the Lima cabildo's appearance and said:

The council building was characterized, between 1596 and 1604 (period of government Viceroy Luis de Velasco y Castilla) by its open gallery on the second floor, on the portals of scribes. According to Manuel de Odriozola, the Rímac River Bridge collapsed on the night of February 11, 1696, causing a flood in the Plaza Mayor and the protocols they had them on the floor, not on shelves so scarce and expensive it was the wood rotted enforcement tools and foundations of chaplaincies and primogeniture, whose replacement was difficult and costly. But the greatest damage suffered by the colonial cabildo caused the 1746 Lima-Callao earthquake, which destroyed 90% of the civil colonial buildings.

See also
Metropolitan Municipality of Lima
City Hall
Historic Center of Lima
Lima

Bibliography 
 City Hall of Lima, Lima – Perú, edited in English by the Culture Office of the Municipality of Lima being Mayor of Lima Architect Eduardo Orrego Villacorta - 1981–1983.

References

Metropolitan Municipality of Lima
National Institute of Culture
Historical Archive of the Municipality of Lima

Palaces in Peru
Buildings and structures in Lima
1551 establishments in the Spanish Empire
Buildings and structures completed in 1551
Government buildings completed in 1944
Tourist attractions in Lima
Architecture in Peru
Spanish Revival architecture
City and town halls in Peru
Cultural heritage of Peru